Cause to Believe (foaled February 11, 2003 in Kentucky) is an American Thoroughbred racehorse. He was a contender for the U.S. Triple Crown in 2006.

Cause to Believe was bred by Overbrook Farm. He is the son of Maria's Mon, the 1995 American Champion Two-Year-Old Colt. Out of the mare Imaginary Cat, a daughter of Storm Cat, his breeding line includes such notable horses as Northern Dancer, Secretariat and Majestic Prince.

Cause to Believe was purchased by Vancouver, British Columbia businessman Peter Redekop for $30,000 at the 2005 Ocala Breeders' Sales Co. March Selected Two-Year-Olds in Training Sale. In early 2006, Redekop sold a 25% interest in the horse to Chicago businessman, Peter Abruzzo.

The colt was trained by Jerry Hollendorfer and ridden by Russell Baze.

Races

References
 National Thoroughbred Racing Association bio
 Cause To Believe's pedigree and racing stats

2003 racehorse births
Thoroughbred family 14-c
Racehorses bred in Kentucky
Racehorses trained in the United States